Bnot Netanya is an Israeli women's football club from Netanya competing in the Israeli first League and the Israeli Women's Cup.

History
The club was established in 2013 by footballer Shelly Israel and entered the league’s second division. The club finished its first season in second place and competed in a promotion/relegation play-off match for a sport in the first division against Bnot Sakhnin, losing 0–7.

In the cup, the club won its first ever cup match, in the 2013–14 competition, against Maccabi Tzur Shalom Bialik 2–1, but lost in the quarter-finals to ASA Tel Aviv University 1–6. The following season the club once again met ASA Tel Aviv University in the first round and was eliminated after losing 0–11.

Current squad

References

External links
 Bnot Netanya Israeli Football Association 

Women's football clubs in Israel
Association football clubs established in 2013